Conde may refer to:

Places

United States 
 Conde, South Dakota, a city

France
 Condé-sur-l'Escaut (or simply 'Condé'), a commune

Linguistic 

Conde is the Ibero-Romance form of "count" (Latin comitatus).
It may refer to:
Counts in Iberia
List of countships in Portugal
Patricia Conde (Spanish actress), Spanish actress
Patricia Conde (Mexican actress)
Rosina Conde (born 1954), Mexican narrator, playwright, poet

See also
Count
Comte (disambiguation) (French, Catalan and Occitan term for "Count")
Conte (disambiguation) (Italian term for "Count")
Condé (disambiguation)